Laura Henderson (née Curran) is an Australian politician. She has been a Liberal member of the South Australian Legislative Council since the 2022 state election.

Henderson grew up in Saudi Arabia before moving to Adelaide for study. She was president of the Liberal Women's Council and a staffer to Senator Alex Antic, and is associated with the conservative faction of the Liberal Party.

Prior to being elected to the Legislative Council in 2022, Henderson had been the Liberal candidate for the state lower house seat of Reynell in 2018 and the federal seat of Kingston in 2019. She was studying the final year for a Bachelor of Laws at University of South Australia during the 2018 election campaign.

References

Year of birth missing (living people)
Living people
Members of the South Australian Legislative Council
Women members of the South Australian Legislative Council
Liberal Party of Australia members of the Parliament of South Australia
21st-century Australian politicians
21st-century Australian women politicians